Custer is a census-designated place (CDP) in Whatcom County, Washington, United States. The population was 366 at the 2010 census.

Geography
According to the United States Census Bureau, the CDP has a total area of 1.8 square miles (4.7 km2), all of it land.

Demographics
As of the census of 2000, there were 299 people, 108 households, and 81 families residing in the CDP. The population density was 164.4 people per square mile (63.4/km2). There were 116 housing units at an average density of 63.8/sq mi (24.6/km2). The racial makeup of the CDP was 92.31% White, 1.67% Asian, 5.35% from other races, and 0.67% from two or more races. Hispanic or Latino of any race were 7.69% of the population.

There were 108 households, out of which 35.2% had children under the age of 18 living with them, 67.6% were married couples living together, 5.6% had a female householder with no husband present, and 24.1% were non-families. 18.5% of all households were made up of individuals, and 10.2% had someone living alone who was 65 years of age or older. The average household size was 2.77 and the average family size was 3.23.

In the CDP, the age distribution of the population shows 28.8% under the age of 18, 7.7% from 18 to 24, 24.7% from 25 to 44, 26.8% from 45 to 64, and 12.0% who were 65 years of age or older. The median age was 36 years. For every 100 females, there were 96.7 males. For every 100 females age 18 and over, there were 104.8 males.

The median income for a household in the CDP was $24.094, and the median income for a family was $30,625. Males had a median income of $38,135 versus $23,977 for females. The per capita income for the CDP was $13,371. About 18.2% of families and 27.7% of the population were below the poverty line, including 31.1% of those under the age of eighteen and 41.7% of those 65 or over.

History 

Custer was named in 1886 after Albert W. Custer, an early settler and the first storekeeper and postmaster of the town. Originally the town was located at the intersection of the current Valley View and Bay Roads. In 1890-1892 the town moved to the current location with the coming of the railroad.

In December 2020, a train derailment led to the spill of approximately 30,000 gallons of oil. Most of the oil burned or evaporated, but possibly up to 8,000 gallons of a type of crude oil could not be recovered. Within weeks, air quality was considered normal and soil mitigation was completed, but the testing of groundwater and ongoing cleanup has been determined to take several years.

Notable people
Country singer Loretta Lynn was a resident of Custer in the 1950s and early 1960s when she was a young wife and mother at the start of her legendary career.

References

Census-designated places in Washington (state)
Census-designated places in Whatcom County, Washington